Joint Task Force (North) is responsible for all Canadian Armed Forces operations and administration in northern Canada, namely Yukon, Northwest Territories, Nunavut, and the waters of the Arctic Ocean (within Canada) and Hudson Bay. JTFN is headquartered in Yellowknife, Northwest Territories, and is part of Canadian Joint Operations Command.

JTFN has received increasing national attention since 2009 with greater emphasis being made on Canada's claim to arctic sovereignty. Each year, hundreds of Canadian soldiers participate in Operation Nanook, an annual display of sovereignty in Canada's northern latitudes. The operation has been held annually since 2007.

Units within area of responsibility

Integral units 
 Joint Task Force (North) Headquarters Yellowknife - Yellowknife, Northwest Territories
 Joint Task Force (North) Headquarters Detachment Nunavut - Iqaluit, Nunavut
 Joint Task Force (North) Headquarters Detachment Yukon - Whitehorse, Yukon

Lodger units 

 440 Transport Squadron (8 Wing Trenton)
C Company (The Yellowknife Company) (The Loyal Edmonton Regiment)
 1st Canadian Ranger Patrol Group (3rd Canadian Division)

Northern operations 
Operation Nanook
Operation Nevus
Operation Nunakput
Operation Nunalivut
Operation Limpid

References

External links

 Joint Task Force North official site

Military units and formations of Canada
Joint military units and formations
Military units and formations of Northern Canada